The WBCA Freshman of the Year is an annual college basketball award presented by Adidas to the most outstanding freshman player. The award was first given following the 2016–17 season.

Key

Winners

Footnotes

References

Awards established in 2017
WBCA Freshman of the Year